This is a list of rulers and office-holders of Italy.

Heads of state
King of Italy
Presidents of the Italian Republic

Heads of government
Prime Ministers of Italy

Ministers
Italian Minister of the Interior
Italian Minister of Foreign Affairs
Italian Minister of Defense
Italian Minister of Justice
Italian Minister of Education

Heads of former states

Princely states
Rulers of Tuscany
Rulers of Milan
Counts and Kings of Sicily
Kings of Naples
Dukes of Savoy, Kings of Sardinia, and Kings of Italy from 1861
Doges of Venice
Dukes of Parma
Dukes of Modena
Dukes of Amalfi
Counts and Dukes of Apulia and Calabria
Chancellor of Florence
Counts of Aversa
Dukes and Princes of Benevento
Gastalds and Princes of Capua
Dukes of Ferrara and of Modena
Dukes of Friuli
Hypati and Dukes of Gaeta
Doge of Genoa
Marquises and Dukes of Mantua
Lords and Dukes of Milan
Marquises of Montferrat
Dukes of Naples
Lords and Princes of Piedmont
Princes of Salerno
Marquises of Saluzzo
Dukes of Spoleto
Princes of Taranto
Rulers of Tuscany
Counts of Tusculum
Doges of Venice

Rome
Roman Emperors
Roman usurpers
List of Kings of Rome
Republican Roman Consuls, Early Imperial Roman Consuls, and Late Imperial Roman Consuls
Censors
Roman dictators
Prefects of the Praetorian Guard
Tyrants of Syracuse, see Syracuse, Italy

Italy
Italy
Rulers
Rulers